Sunae Station is a subway station on the Bundang Line between Seohyeon Station and Jeongja Station. Its substation name is Korea Job World. At the time of the opening of the Bundang Line in 1994, this station was called Chorim Station.

Places
Lotte Department Store Bundang is connected to the station via an underground passageway. In the area around Sunae Station, there are many stores and restaurants, generally more expensive than those located near Seohyeon Station. The area is similar to that of Seohyeon Station, with a wide pedestrian lane of stores and restaurants running north and south of the station and a large indoor shopping center centered above the station, but much quieter than Seohyeon.

Korea Job World is located near Sunae station. Korea job world is the place where students can experience various jobs.

External links
 Station information from Korail

Bundang
Seoul Metropolitan Subway stations
Railway stations opened in 1994
Metro stations in Seongnam